Ungra (German: Galt; Hungarian: Ugra) is a commune in Brașov County, Transylvania, Romania. It is composed of two villages, Dăișoara (Dahl; Longodár) and Ungra.

Ungra is located in the northern part of the county, at 9 kilometers (5.6 mi) from Rupea and 62 kilometers (39 mi) from Brașov. It sits on the right bank on the river Olt, not far from where the Homorod and Dăișoara rivers flow into it.

At the 2011 census, 88.4% of inhabitants were Romanians, 8.4% Roma, 1.7% Germans, and 1.5% Hungarians.

In Ungra there is a medieval 13th century Transylvanian Saxon church and many old houses.

See also
Castra of Hoghiz

References

Communes in Brașov County
Localities in Transylvania
Romani communities in Romania